Holy Trinity Church, Everton is a Grade II* listed parish church in the Church of England in Everton, Nottinghamshire.

History

The church dates from the 11th century with additions in every century to the 16th. There was restoration work in 1841. By 1843 the size of Everton's population meant that yet again Holy Trinity needed extending. This was achieved by increasing the chancel eastward. In addition  an annex on the southern side of the chancel was added. By 1869 Holy Trinity was in need of general restoration. It was during this time that all the gargoyles were removed and the floor was lowered.

The church is in a joint parish with:
St. Peter's Church, Clayworth
St Peter & St Paul's Church, Gringley-on-the-Hill
All Saints' Church, Mattersey

References

Church of England church buildings in Nottinghamshire
Grade II* listed churches in Nottinghamshire